Susan E. Arnold (born March 8, 1954) is an American business executive; she is the chairwoman of The Walt Disney Company.

Life and career
Susan E. Arnold graduated from the University of Pennsylvania with a Bachelor of Arts degree, and from the University of Pittsburgh with a Master of Business Administration degree.

She is an operating executive of The Carlyle Group, since September 2013. She is based in New York. Arnold has served on the board of directors of The Walt Disney Company since 2007, as well as the Carlyle portfolio investments company NBTY, The Nature's Bounty Co. She has also been a member of the Board of Directors of McDonald's Co. since 2008.  In 2004 she became Vice Chairman of Procter & Gamble and President of the company in 2007. She had joined Procter & Gamble in 1980 and held several management and marketing positions before becoming the manager of Procter & Gamble's cosmetics business in Canada in 1990. In 1999, she assumed global responsibility for Procter & Gamble's beauty business, thereby becoming the first woman to reach a president-level position in the company. She retired from Procter & Gamble on September 1, 2009.  According to Forbes, Susan Arnold got her start as a brand assistant on the Dawn/Ivory Snow Group.

Since 2002, she has been listed on Fortune magazine's 50 Most Powerful Women in Business as #7 in 2008. In 2004 and 2005, she was listed on the Wall Street Journal's 50 Women to Watch. She was listed multiple times on the Forbes list of The World's Most Powerful Women and in 2005 she was #16 on Forbes The World's 100 Most Powerful Women list. She served for several years on the executive committee of Catalyst, a nonprofit organization working toward the advancement of women in business. In June 2022, she was recognized by the International Hospitality Institute on the Global 100 in Hospitality as one of the 100 Most Powerful People in Global Hospitality.

She is openly lesbian.

Disney
On December 1, 2021, Arnold was appointed to replace Bob Iger as chair of the board at The Walt Disney Company and became the first woman to be appointed to this position in the 98-year history of Disney. She was elected chair on December 31, 2021.  On January 11, 2023, Disney announced that Arnold would no longer serve as the board's chair after the next annual shareholder meeting and would be replaced by former Nike CEO Mark Parker.

References

External links
Susan Arnold Corporate bio

Living people
Procter & Gamble people
McDonald's people
Directors of The Walt Disney Company
Wharton School of the University of Pennsylvania alumni
Joseph M. Katz Graduate School of Business alumni
1954 births
20th-century American businesspeople
20th-century American businesswomen
American LGBT businesspeople
Lesbian businesswomen
21st-century American businesswomen
21st-century American businesspeople
American women business executives
Chairmen of The Walt Disney Company